Unspeakable is an eight-episode Canadian television drama series created and written by Robert C. Cooper, which aired on CBC Television and SundanceTV in the 2018–19 television season. Based on the books Bad Blood by Vic Parsons and The Gift of Death by Andre Picard, the series chronicles the emergence of HIV/AIDS and Hepatitis C in the Canadian Red Cross's blood banks in the early 1980s.

Cast
Sanders family:
Sarah Wayne Callies as Margaret Sanders
Michael Shanks as Will Sanders
Ricardo Ortiz as Ryan Sanders
Spencer Drever as Ryan Sanders (teen)
Landry family:
Shawn Doyle as Ben Landry
Camille Sullivan as Alice Landry
Levi Meaden as Peter Thomas Landry
Mackenzie Cardwell as Emma Landry
Trinity Likins as Emma Landry (child)
Krepke family:
Aaron Douglas as Jim Krepke
Karyn Mott as Lisa Krepke
Hartley family:
David Lewis as Lawrence Hartley
Katelyn Peterson as Jessica Hartley
Others
Brian Markinson as Roger Perrault
Randy Charach as Commons chair
Paloma Kwiatkowski as Elizabeth Darby Stephens
Diana Bang as Ruby Kim
Ryan Grantham as Andy Girard

Episodes

References

External links
 

2010s Canadian drama television series
CBC Television original programming
Television shows filmed in Vancouver
Television shows set in Vancouver
2019 Canadian television series debuts
2019 Canadian television series endings
Works about contaminated haemophilia blood products